MAYA-1 is an optical submarine telephone cable.

It began service in 2000, using SDH and EDFA technologies and has a capacity of 82.5 Gbit/s.

It has landing points in:
Hollywood, Florida, United States
Cancún, Mexico
Half Moon Bay, Grand Cayman, Cayman Islands
Puerto Cortes, Honduras
Puerto Limon, Costa Rica
Maria Chiquita, Panama
Tolú, Colombia

See also 
List of international submarine communications cables

External links 
 MAYA-1 Cable System
 ICPC-Caribbean Region

Submarine communications cables in the Caribbean Sea
2000 establishments in North America
2000 establishments in Colombia